Lichfield District Council elections are held every four years. Lichfield District Council is the local authority for the non-metropolitan district of Lichfield in Staffordshire, England. Since the last boundary changes in 2015, 47 councillors have been elected from 22 wards.

Political control
The city of Lichfield had been a municipal borough from 1836 to 1974, with a city council. Under the Local Government Act 1972 a larger Lichfield District was created, also covering the surrounding rural area. The first election to the new district council was held in 1973, initially operating as a shadow authority before the new arrangements took effect on 1 April 1974. Political control of the council since 1974 has been held by the following parties:

Leadership
The leaders of the council since 1977 have been:

Council elections
1973 Lichfield District Council election
1976 Lichfield District Council election
1979 Lichfield District Council election (New ward boundaries)
1983 Lichfield District Council election
1987 Lichfield District Council election
1991 Lichfield District Council election (District boundary changes took place but the number of seats remained the same)
1995 Lichfield District Council election (District boundary changes took place but the number of seats remained the same)
1999 Lichfield District Council election
2003 Lichfield District Council election (New ward boundaries)
2007 Lichfield District Council election
2011 Lichfield District Council election
2015 Lichfield District Council election (New ward boundaries)
2019 Lichfield District Council election

By-election results

1999-2003

2003-2007

2007-2011

References

 By-election results

External links
Lichfield District Council

 
Council elections in Staffordshire
District council elections in England